Anatolia: An International Journal of Tourism and Hospitality Research is a journal in the field of tourism and hospitality. It is published by Routledge and is indexed in databases including Scopus, Emerging Sources Citation Index, International Bibliography of Periodical Literature and CAB International's Leisure, Recreation and Tourism Abstracts. It was established in 1990.

References

External links

Routledge academic journals
Tourism journals
Publications established in 1990